The Federal Commission of Telecommunications (Comisión Federal de Telecomunicaciones) (CoFeTel) was the regulator of telecommunications in Mexico, and was part of the Mexico's Secretariat of Communications and Transport (SCT). Formed in 1996 and replaced in 2013, Cofetel was roughly equivalent to the Federal Communications Commission in the United States, and Ofcom in the United Kingdom. Among its duties were licensing of broadcasting stations and regulation of telephone companies.

As of September 2013 COFETEL has been replaced by the IFT, the Federal Telecommunications Institute.

References

External links
Official website
Federal Commission of Telecommunications English website

Executive branch of the government of Mexico
Telecommunications in Mexico
Telecommunications law